Mannar Mathai Speaking 2 is a 2014 Indian Malayalam-language comedy thriller film directed by Mamas K. Chandran. It is a sequel to the 1995 comedy Mannar Mathai Speaking and the third installment in the celebrated Ramji Rao franchise. Actors Innocent, Mukesh, Sai Kumar, Biju Menon, Vijayaraghavan and Janardhanan reprised their roles; while Aparna Gopinath, Shammi Thilakan and a few others are also included in the cast. The film features original music & background score composed by Rahul Raj.

Plot
Mannar Mathai is now running a travel agency Urvashi Tours & Travels, his partners in this agency are his old mates Gopalakrishnan and Balakrishnan. Their drama group which was started in 1989, is celebrating its 25th anniversary and Mannar Mathai wants to perform a drama on this occasion. But Gopalakrishnan & Balakrishnan are not ready for this because their previous attempts in drama led them to nothing but problems. When they need a driver for their agency, they give an Ad in the news paper. But Mathai also gives an extra Ad which says "Heroine required" which leads a young woman named Nithya and her friend Unni to their agency. Balakrishnan and Gopalakrishnan see Unni as a potential driver replacement for their old driver Koshi due to his fluency in English because most of their customers requesting for travels are from other countries and Unni, being fluent in English, would be able to help them.

Meanwhile, Mathai sees Nithya as a potential lead actress for his upcoming play which would bring back glory to Urvashi Theaters and respect to the field of drama. One night, they get an unexpected visitor who is nobody else than Mahendra Varma. Much to the relief of Balakrishnan, Gopalakrishnan, and Mannar Mathai, when he fell from the top of the building on to the hood of Ramji Rao's car, he became mentally impaired and is always requesting for Beedi cigarettes. Later onward, the three decide to forgive Mahendran for his wrongdoings against them, but discover other things as well. They discover that Unni and Nithya were framed for bank fraud back in Bangalore. To their horror, they discover that Nithya is the daughter of  Ramji Rao. However, Ramji Rao, after escaping with the money, he has given up his criminal ways and was baptized, becoming a Christian and soon marrying and having Nithya as his daughter. He was no longer Ramji Rao, but went by his pastor name of Kunjumon (meaning "little boy" in Malayalam). Another thing they find out is that Mahendran has a twin brother named Hareendra Varma, an international criminal wanted for murdering an Italian diamond merchant for a rare diamond that let loose a light pattern on the wall when held up to light. Mahendran had been entrusted with the diamond by Hareendran but Mahendra had wandered off. Hareendran kidnaps the twin teenage daughters of Gopalakrishnan and demands the diamond. Mannar Mathai, Balakrishnan, and Gopalakrishnan realize that the bag that the diamond is in is under the possession currently of the S.I Babumon and decide to get Ramji Rao and steal it for them by faking that Nithya is in danger, but "complications" arise when Garvasees Aashan kidnap Nithya in order to force Gopalakrishnan to accept the lead actress that they pick out. But when Ramji Rao finds out that Nithya is not with them, he refuses to give the back. Mahendran tells him to give the back but he again refuses. Koshi and Unni hits Ramji Rao with a log and they takes the back. They goes to Hareendran's place to save Gopalakrishnan's daughters. He gives the bag to Hareendran through Mahendran and he finds the diamond. He locks Mahendran in a room. When Gopalakrishnan goes to save his daughters, Hareendran plays a foul. He tries to kill Gopalakrishnan, Mannar Mathai and Balakrishnan thinking that if he leaves the trio then he can't escape. Babumon and his men arrives there. Hareendran thinks that Gopalakrishnan has informed the police. He goes and saves his daughters. Hareendran hits Babumon and takes a gun and tries to shoot the trio and the police. When he was about shoot, Garvasees Aashan arrives there with his men. Gopalakrishnan tricks him by saying that they practicing a drama. A fight occurs between Garvasees Aashan and his men, the police, Hareendran and his men and the trio. Ramji Rao arrives there and sees what all is happening. He manages to reunite with Nithya. Gopalakrishnan and Balakrishnan manages to defeat Hareendran's men and confronts Hareendran with Mannar Mathai. Hareendran escapes and hides in a room. Gopalakrishnan and Balakrishnan breaks the room and trashes him. After the fight, Hareendran and his men get arrested by the police. As they go to the police station, Babumon realises that he had arrested Mahendran not Hareendran. It is revealed that when Hareendran was hiding in the room there was Mahendran who was smoking a bidi cigarette. He takes the bidi and smokes it. Before Gopalakrishnan and Balakrishnan could break the door, he had swapped dresses with Mahendran. The duo had beaten Mahendran.

On the day of the 25th anniversary, Mathai is ready to play a drama with Gopalakrishnan and Balakrishnan. Gopalakrishnan finds the diamond on Mathai's crown. When he asks about it, Mathai tells that he stole it as nobody will come asking for it. When Gopalakrishnan goes and checks the audience, he finds Hareendran and calls Mathai and Balakrishnan. When he looks back with them, he finds him missing. Then they play their drama.

Reception
The film received negative reviews from critics. Sify movies commented, "You can only watch Director Mamas's Mannar Mathai Speaking 2 with tremendous anger and disbelief as he makes a mockery of two much loved films with this one. Please don't speak again, Mr. Mannar Mathai!" Rediff movie reviews commented, "Mannar Mathai Speaking 2 is a repeat of what we've seen before."

Cast

 Innocent as Mannar Mathai
 Mukesh as Gopalakrishnan
 Sai Kumar as Balakrishnan
 Biju Menon as Hareendra Varma & Mahendra Varma (Double Role)
 Vijayaraghavan as Ramji Rao / Pastor Kunjumon
 Aparna Gopinath as Nithya
 Janardhanan as Garvasees Aashan
 Indrans as Ponnappan
 Priyanka Anoop as Shakunthala
 Shammi Thilakan as Driver Koshi
 Akshitha as Malayali House Fame
 Kalabhavan Shajon as Babumon, SI of Police
 Niyas Backer as Cook Manjulan
 Basil as Unni
 Chembil Ashokan
 Ullas Pandalam
 Andrew Ross as the Diamond Smuggler
 Naseer Sankranthi
 Vani Viswanath as Lakshmi (Meera/Stella Fernandez) [Special appearance in the title song] (From the first part's film shots)
 Sukumari as Balakrishnan's mother [Special appearance in the title song] (From the first part's film shots)

Music

The music and background score of the movie are composed, orchestrated and produced by Rahul Raj. The soundtrack opened to positive reviews with Music Aloud.com saying "Composer Rahul Raj continues the franchise's tradition of entertaining music", while particularly mentioning that the interludes of Gathakalaporin are 'brilliant'. Milliblog.com hailed Mizhikaloro as the best song for its fantastic tune and catchy arrangements.

References

External links
 

2014 films
2014 comedy films
Indian comedy films
Indian sequel films
Speaking3
Films scored by Rahul Raj
2010s Malayalam-language films

ml:മാന്നാർമത്തായി സ്പീക്കിങ്ങ്